WRIR-LP 97.3 FM is an independent, all volunteer, nonprofit community public radio station licensed to Richmond, Virginia, serving Metro Richmond. It is the largest low power FM station of its kind in the United States. WRIR-LP is owned and operated by the Virginia Center for Public Press.  The station's studios are located on West Broad Street and its transmitter is located northeast of downtown Richmond. WRIR-LP started broadcasting on January 1, 2005.

See also
List of community radio stations in the United States

References

External links
 Richmond Independent Radio Online
 

RIR
RIR
Community radio stations in the United States
NPR member stations
R
Radio stations established in 2004
Adult album alternative radio stations in the United States